XHEOA-FM/XEOA-AM is a radio station on 94.9 FM and 570 AM in Oaxaca, Oaxaca. It is owned by Radiorama and known as La Mexicana with a Regional Mexican format.

History
XEOA-AM 570 received its concession on June 28, 1956. It broadcast with 5,000 watts day and 250 night. It was sold from Radio Oaxaca, S.A., to the current concessionaire in 2000.

XEOA received approval to migrate to FM in 2010, but it was required to maintain its AM station, as communities could lose radio service were the AM station to go off the air.

References

Radio stations in Oaxaca City
Radio stations in Mexico with continuity obligations